Thurlow is a surname and a given name. Notable people with the name include:

Surname:
 Alan Thurlow (born 1946), English organist
 Bryan Thurlow (1936–2002), English professional football player
 Clifford Thurlow (born 1952), British biographer
 Edward Thurlow, 1st Baron Thurlow, (1731–1806), British lawyer and Lord Chancellor 1778–1783
 Natalie Thurlow (born as Campbell), New Zealand curler
 Pud Thurlow (1903–1975), Australian cricketer
 Steve Thurlow (born 1942), American professional football player
 Thomas Thurlow (disambiguation), multiple people

Given name:
 Thurlow Cooper (1933–2008), American football player
 Thurlow Essington (1886–1964), American lawyer and politician
 Thurlow Lieurance (1878–1963), American composer
 Thurlow Weed (1797–1882), American newspaper publisher and politician
 Thurlow Tad Weed (1933–2006), American football placekicker

Thurlow is also a former township in Hastings County, Ontario, now part of Belleville, Ontario, Canada.

See also
 Baron Thurlow
 (Great) Thurlow, a village in Suffolk